The Bank of the Commonwealth, also known as the Old Stone Bank, is a historic building on the National Register of Historic Places in Shepherdsville, Kentucky. According to its registration it was constructed around 1809 and operated by Abraham Field as Kentucky's first bank. Although Field, a local merchant, purchased the property in 1821, the rest of this history is in doubt, as is the building's connection to the state-owned Bank of the Commonwealth.

See also

References

National Register of Historic Places in Bullitt County, Kentucky
Bank buildings on the National Register of Historic Places in Kentucky
1809 establishments in Kentucky
Federal architecture in Kentucky
Commercial buildings completed in 1809